The Wilson Sporting Goods Company is an American sports equipment manufacturer based in Chicago, Illinois. The company has been a subsidiary of Finnish multinational company Amer Sports since 1989, and is, in turn, now under the Chinese company Anta Sports since 2019. Wilson makes equipment for many sports, among them baseball, badminton, American football, basketball, fastpitch softball, golf, racquetball, soccer, squash, tennis, pickleball and volleyball.

The company owns the brands Atec, DeMarini, EvoShield, Louisville Slugger, and Luxilon to provide sports equipment and protective gear for baseball, lacrosse, softball, and tennis.

History

The company traces its roots to the "Schwarzschild & Sulzberger" meatpacking company (later changed to "Sulzberger & Son's") based in New York, that operated meat packing slaughterhouses.

Sulzberger & Son's founded the "Ashland Manufacturing Company" in 1913 to use animal by-products from its slaughterhouses. It started out in 1914, making tennis racket strings, violin strings, and surgical sutures, but soon expanded into baseball shoes and tennis racquets.

In 1915, Thomas E. Wilson, former president of meatpacker Morris & Company, was appointed president by the controlling banks and renamed the company "Thomas E. Wilson Company". The company acquired the Hetzinger Knitting Mills to produce athletic uniforms and a caddie bag company which produced golf balls but soon expanded into footballs and basketballs.

In 1918, Wilson left to concentrate on the beef-packing business, changing the Sulzberger company to Wilson & Co. (which would ultimately become Iowa Beef Packers and then be taken over by Tyson Foods).  The packing company continued to have control in the company until 1967 when it was sold to Ling-Temco-Vought.

Under new president Lawrence Blaine Icely, it acquired the "Chicago Sporting Goods Company" and struck a deal to supply the Chicago Cubs.  It also hired Arch Turner, a leather designer who would design the leather football.

In 1922, it introduced the Ray Schalk catcher's mitt which later became the standard.  It worked with Knute Rockne to introduce the double-lined leather football and first valve football and the first waist-line football pants with pads. In 1925, it was renamed "Wilson-Western Sporting Goods" following a distribution agreement with "Western Sporting Goods".

After Rockne's death, the company focused on golf, introducing the R-90, a sand wedge golf club inspired by Gene Sarazen's victory in the 1932 British Open.

In 1931, it renamed itself "Wilson Sporting Goods Company". During World War II it introduced the Wilson Duke football, featuring high-quality leather, ends that were hand-sewn, lock-stitch seams, and triple lining, which was adopted as the official ball of the National Football League in 1941; this partnership between Wilson and NFL has continued since.

Horween Leather Company has supplied Wilson with pebbled cowhide since 1941 for use in the manufacture of footballs and basketballs. Wilson is Horween Leather Company's largest customer.

Wilson became the official game ball supplier of the newly-formed Basketball Association of America (BAA; the forerunner league of what would eventually become today's NBA) in 1946, this partnership would last 37 years.

After the World War II, Wilson focused on tennis and signed Jack Kramer, who developed its line of Jack Kramer signed tennis rackets. L. B. Icely died in 1950, but the company continued to expand. In 1955, it acquired Ohio-Kentucky Manufacturing for making footballs.

In 1964, Wilson acquired "Wonder Products Company", which made toys and custom-molded items. The company transformed the custom-mold section to make protective equipment for American football and baseball, such as face masks for football helmets and leg guards for baseball catchers.

In 1967, the company was acquired by Ling-Temco-Vought. Only three years later, PepsiCo became new Wilson's owner. In those days, the company manufactured and commercialized the official balls of both, NBA and NFL, and provided most of the uniforms of teams in Major League Baseball (MLB) and the United States Summer Olympics teams.

In 1979, Wilson tennis balls were first used in the US Open, and still are used to this day. In 2006, the Australian Open began using Wilson Tennis Balls. In 1985, Wilson was acquired by Westray Capital Corporation through subsidiary WSGC Holdings. In 1989, WSGC merged with Bogey Acquisitions Company, which is affiliated with the Finnish group Amer Sports.

In May 2020, it was announced that Wilson became the NBA and WNBA official ball supplier, starting with the 2021 season. Wilson will return as NBA ball maker, replacing Spalding, after the latter company's 37-year partnership with the league.

Products
Wilson manufactures and commercializes a variety of products for several sports. The following chart contains all the product lines by the company.

Notes

Louisville Slugger
The Louisville Slugger brand baseball bat has been manufactured since 1884, and has been very popular in professional baseball for many decades. The bat was endorsed by Honus Wagner in 1905 (likely the first endorsement of a product by an American professional athlete), and was used by Babe Ruth along with many other baseball stars through history.

The Louisville Slugger brand was controlled and manufactured by Hillerich & Bradsby from 1884 until 2015, when the brand was bought by Wilson. The brand complements Wilson's existing DeMarini subsidiary which also produces bats. Hillerich & Bradsby remains an independent business and continues to manufacture bats as an exclusive supplier for Wilson. The company also operates Louisville Slugger Museum and Factory, an attraction in downtown Louisville, Kentucky which showcases the story of Louisville Slugger baseball bats in baseball and in American history.

P72 baseball bat
The P72 model Louisville Slugger bat was created in 1954 (while the brand was still under the ownership of Hillerich & Bradsby) for career minor leaguer Les Pinkham, and became one of baseball's most popular bats. Baseball Hall of Famers Cal Ripken Jr. and Robin Yount are among the players who used the P72 over the years. New York Yankee star Derek Jeter used the P72 for every at bat in his 20 MLB seasons, with over 12,500 plate appearances and 3,749 P72 models ordered.

On September 25, 2014, in honor of Jeter's impending retirement, the P72 designation was retired, and the bat was renamed the DJ2 (Jeter wore #2). Descendants of Les Pinkam will still be allowed to get the bat with its P72 designation. In addition to retiring the P72 model number, Louisville Slugger also promised to give the final 72 P72 bats produced to Jeter to raise funds for his Turn 2 Foundation.

Sponsorships

American football
Wilson has been the official game ball supplier of the NFL and CFL since 1941 and 1995, respectively, and the now defunct UFL and AAF; in addition, the company also makes footballs for college and high school levels of play.

Baseball
Wilson makes a variety of baseball gloves for several different patterns: Wilson has 3 series of baseball gloves. The A2K, The A2000, and the A1K, as well as many other models for younger children. The A2K is made from Wilson's Pro Stock Select leather, which is made from triple sorting their famous pro stock leather. A stock A2k (Pro Stock select leather) retails for US$360. The A2000, made from Wilson's Pro Stock leather is the oldest glove series Wilson offers. The a2000 retails for US$260. The A1k is made from Wilson's top-shelf leather and retails US$130. Some of Wilson's most famous patterns include the datdude,1786, Dp15, 1787, 1776, 1788, 1799, 2800, M1, 1791 Pudge, and many others.

Basketball
Wilson has been the official ball supplier for many FIBA competitions, the NBA, the WNBA, the NCAA basketball championship tournaments and many others.

Golf

Wilson Staff is the golf division of Wilson Sporting Goods. The company designs and manufactures a full range of golf equipment, accessories and clothing using the Wilson Staff, ProStaff and Ultra brands.

Many of the world's top professional golfers have used Wilson equipment including Nick Faldo, Arnold Palmer and Ben Crenshaw; the latter two of whom used Wilson 8802 putters. Crenshaw's even received the moniker Little Ben due to his proficiency with it. Current Wilson Staff players include British Open and PGA Championship champion Pádraig Harrington, and U.S. Open champion Gary Woodland.

Soccer
Wilson has been the official ball supplier for NCAA soccer.

Tennis

Wilson is a major manufacturer of tennis rackets. The original kevlar Pro Staff model racket, known for its use by Pete Sampras, was heavy (more than 350g strung) and small-headed (85 sq. in.); Roger Federer also used the same racket model. As of 2015, he uses the Pro Staff RF97 Autograph model that is heavy (340 g/12 oz unstrung) and larger (97 sq. in.). Jim Courier and Stefan Edberg also used the Pro Staff Original, Edberg later switching to the Pro Staff Classic in 1991, which was the same racket (85 sq. in. with slightly rounded frame edges) but with different paint work. In late 2009, Wilson unveiled their latest line of rackets, codenamed 20x, which they would later rename BLX. This line directly replaces their previous K-Factor series with all new technologies. Also, many pros use custom-made rackets that perform differently from the mass-produced versions.

Aside from tennis rackets, the Wilson sporting goods company also makes tennis balls (including the official balls of the US Open and starting in 2020, the French Open major championships), shoes, balls, strings, clothes, and racquet bags.

Volleyball
Wilson is the official ball supplier of the AVP.

In popular culture
A Wilson volleyball "co-starred" alongside Tom Hanks in the film Cast Away. Hanks' character named the ball, with a smiling face drawn from a bloody handprint, which he became deeply attached to, "Wilson" in the film. After the success of the film, Wilson Sporting Goods actually created and marketed special edition volleyballs with Wilson's "face" printed on.

See also

Ripper (racquet)

References

External links

 

 

Wilson Sporting Goods
1913 establishments in Illinois
1989 mergers and acquisitions
Manufacturing companies based in Chicago
Manufacturing companies established in 1913
American companies established in 1913
Sporting goods brands
Sporting goods manufacturers of the United States
Sportswear brands
Tennis equipment manufacturers
Former PepsiCo subsidiaries
American subsidiaries of foreign companies